Peaceful World is the eighth studio album (a double-LP) by rock band The Rascals, released on May 5, 1971. It peaked at number 122 on the Billboard 200 chart. In Canada, the album reached number 50. The single "Love Me" reached number 95 on the Billboard Hot 100.

History
Vocalist Eddie Brigati left the Rascals in August 1970, with guitarist Gene Cornish leaving the following month. By October, a new lineup of the Rascals was assembled featuring original members Felix Cavaliere (vocals/keyboards) and Dino Danelli (drums), and several new players, including ex-Paul Butterfield Blues Band guitarist Buzz Feiten and vocalist Annie Sutton. Peaceful World was the first album featuring this new version of the band. It was also the Rascals' first album for the CBS/Columbia label, after almost six years with Atlantic Records.

Many of the songs on Peaceful World were jazz-influenced, as opposed to the "blue-eyed soul" style of the Rascals' heyday; the title track, in particular, was a long piece featuring improvisation and multiple extended solos.

Peaceful World was reissued along with The Island of Real on the BGO label in 2008.

Reception

Writing for Allmusic, critic Jim Newsom praised the album and wrote Peaceful World was "a wonderful blend of soul, jazz, and funk that never found an audience.. Despite its lack of commercial success, this was an artistic triumph for Felix Cavaliere... his ambitious album took the Rascals to the place Cavaliere had been headed over the course of the last couple of albums—but, sadly, the fans didn't follow." Robert Christgau admired the change of direction the album took to jazz, but also wrote; "Yet in the end the jazz musicians he's signed on—Fathead Newman, Joe Farrell, Pepper Adams, Ron Carter—aren't especially well-suited to popularize Coltrane and Pharoah and Sun Ra. And even if Felix were singing enough, he wouldn't be singing very good stuff—composition has never been his strength..."

In his review for the reissue of Peaceful World/The Island of Real, critic Thom Jurek wrote of the album " Peaceful World is a sprawling yet very focused collection of songs... The remarkable aspect of this gorgeous record is that it sounds vintage but not dated. The production is clean, the funk is in the cut, and the communication between musicians in the charts is tight."

Track listing
All songs by Felix Cavaliere; except "In and Out of Love" & "Icy Water" by Buzzy Feiten

Side 1
 "Sky Trane" – 5:47
 "In and Out of Love" – 3:13
 "Bit of Heaven" – 3:30
 "Love Me" – 3:48

Side 2
 "Mother Nature Land" – 3:31
 "Icy Water" – 4:31
 "Happy Song" – 3:42
 "Love Letter" – 5:27

Side 3
 "Little Dove" – 6:30
 "Visit to Mother Nature Land" – 5:04
 "Getting Nearer" – 8:57

Side 4
 "Peaceful World" – 21:25

Personnel
 Felix Cavaliere – vocals, keyboards, marimba, organ, piano
 Dino Danelli – drums
 Howard "Buzz" Feiten – guitar, bass, background vocals
 Annie Sutton – vocals
 Linc Chamberland – guitar, horn arrangements
 Gerald Jemmott – bass
 Robert Popwell – bass
 Chuck Rainey – bass
 William Salter – bass
 Hubert Laws – flute
 Alice Coltrane – harp
 Pepper Adams – baritone saxophone
 Garnett Brown – horn, trombone
 Ron Carter – bass
 Joe Farrell – flute, soprano sax, tenor sax
 Molly Holt – background vocals
 Buddy Buono – background vocals
 Cynthia Webb – background vocals
 Ralph MacDonald – bells, conga, percussion, shaker, talking drum
 Joe Newman – trumpet
 Ernie Royal – trumpet
 Jon Robert Smith (born 1946) – saxophone
 Ernie Wilkins – saxophone 
 James Green, Jerry Lee Smith - recording engineer
 Bob Irwin - mastering engineer

References 

1971 albums
The Rascals albums
Albums produced by Felix Cavaliere
Columbia Records albums